Willie Otis Howard (born November 5, 1956) is an American former basketball player who played in the National Basketball Association (NBA). Howard was drafted by the Milwaukee Bucks in the fourth round of the 1978 NBA Draft and began that season as a member of the team. He was later traded to the Detroit Pistons for a fourth-round draft pick.

A two-time Ohio Valley Conference Basketball Player of the Year, Howard is an inductee in the Austin Peay Athletics Hall of Fame.

References

1956 births
Living people
African-American basketball players
American expatriate basketball people in Italy
American expatriate basketball people in Spain
American men's basketball players
Austin Peay Governors men's basketball players
Auxilium Pallacanestro Torino players
Basket Rimini Crabs players
Basketball players from Tennessee
Detroit Pistons players
FC Barcelona Bàsquet players
Liga ACB players
Milwaukee Bucks draft picks
Milwaukee Bucks players
Montecatiniterme Basketball players
People from Oak Ridge, Tennessee
Power forwards (basketball)
Tenerife AB players
21st-century African-American people
20th-century African-American sportspeople